Meic Stephens (23 July 1938 – 2 July 2018) was a Welsh literary editor, journalist, translator, and poet.

Birth and education
Meic Stephens was born on 23 July 1938 in the village of Treforest, near Pontypridd, Glamorgan. He was educated at Pontypridd Boys' Grammar School and then studied at the University College of Wales, Aberystwyth, graduating in 1961, at the University of Rennes, Brittany, and the University College of North Wales, Bangor, Gwynedd.

Career 
From 1962 to 1966 he taught French at Ebbw Vale, Monmouthshire. In Merthyr Tydfil he established the Triskel Press and in 1965 he began the periodical, Poetry Wales. He learnt Welsh as an adult, and became a member of the Welsh Language Society and of Plaid Cymru.

After working for the Western Mail for almost a year, from 1967 to 1990 Stephens was literature director of the Welsh Arts Council. Before retiring he was professor of Welsh Writing in English at the University of Glamorgan. He was also a visiting professor in the English department of Brigham Young University in Provo, Utah.

Stephens is credited as the first person to create the  graffiti near Llanrhystyd, Ceredigion. This painted slogan has come to be regarded as an unofficial "national landmark" commemorating Capel Celyn, a Welsh-speaking village near Bala, which was destroyed by the construction of the Llyn Celyn reservoir in the early 1960s.

Writings 
Stephens wrote many articles about literature in Wales for the Western Mail, as well as obituaries of eminent Welsh people for The Independent. He took a particular interest in the life and work of Rhys Davies, the novelist and short story writer, and founded and served as secretary of the Rhys Davies Trust, which promoted the writing of short fiction in Wales.

Stephens's works include:

Linguistic Minorities in Western Europe (1976. J. D. Lewis )
Green Horse (1978. )
 [ed.] The Oxford Companion to the Literature of Wales (1986; republished in 1998 as The New Companion to the Literature of Wales. Oxford University Press )
Illuminations: An Anthology of Welsh Short Prose (1998. Welsh Academic Press )
A Most Peculiar People: Quotations About Wales and the Welsh (1992. University of Wales Press )
Little Book of Welsh Quotations (1997. Appletree Press )
A Pocket Guide Series: Wales in Quotation (1999. University of Wales Press )
Welsh Names for Your Children: The Complete Guide (2000. Y Lolfa )
The Literary Pilgrim in Wales: A Guide to the Places Associated with Writers in Wales (2000. Gwasg Carreg Gwalch )
A Semester in Zion: A Journal with Memoirs (2003. Gwasg Carreg Gwalch )
Yeah, Dai Dando (2008. Cinnamon )
A Bard for Highgrove: A Likely Story (2010. Cambria Books )
Cofnodion – Hunangofiant  (2012. Y Lolfa )
Welsh Lives – Gone but Not Forgotten (2012. Y Lolfa )
 (2013. Parthian Books )
Wilia – Cerddi 2003–2013 (2014. Cyhoeddiadau Barddas )
My Shoulder to the Wheel (2015. Y Lolfa )
The Old Red Tongue: An Anthology of Welsh Literature (2017. Francis Boutle Publishers )
More Welsh Lives (2018. Y Lolfa )
Luis Núñez Astrain, The Basques: Their Struggle for Independence (translation) (1997. Welsh Academic Press )

Honours 
Stephens was honoured as a Fellow of Aberystwyth University in 2018.

Death 
Stephens died in Cardiff on 2 July 2018. He had four children; his son Huw Stephens is a radio presenter.

References

External links 
 Rhys Davies Trust – official website
 Meic Stephens, profile – Seren Books 
Tributes – WalesOnline
Obituary – The Independent
Catalogue of publications – WorldCat

1938 births
2018 deaths
Academics of the University of Glamorgan
Alumni of Aberystwyth University
Alumni of Bangor University
Bards of the Gorsedd
People educated at Pontypridd High School
Welsh-speaking academics
People from Pontypridd
20th-century Welsh historians
21st-century Welsh poets
21st-century British male writers
21st-century Welsh historians